West Ham is a London Underground, Docklands Light Railway (DLR) and National Rail intermodal interchange station in West Ham, London, United Kingdom. The station is served by London Underground's District, Hammersmith & City and Jubilee lines, the Stratford International branch of the DLR, and c2c National Rail services.

The station was opened in 1901 by the London, Tilbury and Southend Railway on the route from Fenchurch Street to Barking. In the late 1990s, the station was rebuilt and significantly expanded as part of the Jubilee Line Extension, fully opening in 1999. The station is in London fare zone 2 and zone 3.

History

East to west alignment
The London, Tilbury and Southend Railway direct line from Bow to Barking was constructed east to west through the middle of the Parish of West Ham in 1858. Before this, trains took a longer route via Stratford and Forest Gate to the north. The new line opened with stations initially at Bromley, Plaistow and East Ham. In November 1897 Arnold Hills, the owner of the Thames Ironworks and Shipbuilding Company, whose football team Thames Ironworks F.C. (which reformed in 1900 as West Ham United) played at the Memorial Grounds, secured an agreement with the  London, Tilbury and Southend Railway to build a station at the intersection of Manor Road and Memorial Avenue. The company board approved this in February 1898 and Mowlem's was given the contract to build a four platform station, which allowed for the proposed quadrupling of the line with the completion of the Whitechapel and Bow Railway. The station was completed in May 1900, but did not open until 1 February 1901. The station was initially known as West Ham.

The North London Railway had run a daily service to Plaistow via the Bow-Bromley curve since 18 May 1869 and when West Ham opened it used the northern platforms. In 1905 they switched to the southern platforms, with the opening of a new bay platform at Plaistow on the southern side. The Whitechapel and Bow Railway allowed through services of the Metropolitan District Railway to operate through West Ham to Upminster from 1902. The Metropolitan District converted to electric trains in 1905 and services were cut back to East Ham. The London, Tilbury and Southend Railway trains from Fenchurch Street used the southern platforms when the Metropolitan District services began but stopping was reduced to a few a week in 1908 and to nil in 1913. Ownership of the station passed to the Midland Railway in 1912 and the London, Midland and Scottish Railway in 1923. The station was renamed West Ham (Manor Road) on 11 February 1924. When the North London Railway service to Plaistow ceased on 1 January 1916 the southern platforms were unused in normal service.

The Metropolitan District Railway was incorporated into London Transport in 1933, and became known as the District line. Hammersmith & City line services started, as part of the Metropolitan line, in 1936. The southern platforms were removed after war damage in 1940 which had completely closed the station from 7 September 1940 until 11 August 1941. After nationalisation of the railways in 1948 management of the station passed to British Railways.  In 1969 ownership was transferred to the London Underground and the station was renamed back to West Ham on 1 January.

On 15 March 1976, nine people were injured here by an explosion on a train by a member of the Provisional IRA. Julius Stephen, the driver of the train, was shot dead at the scene when he attempted to pursue the fleeing bomber.

As part of the Jubilee Line Extension, the station was completely rebuilt, with reconstructed District and Hammersmith and City line platforms. In addition, platforms were re-established on the main line from Fenchurch Street, now operated by c2c. As part of the work, the existing entrance was closed, and the refurbished ticket hall became a connecting concourse to the new ticket hall and the rest of the station. Additionally, the station was made fully accessible.

The island platform for c2c services, along with the access staircases, are narrow and get easily congested. To ensure safety for passengers, staff must be present on the platforms at peak times. c2c have proposed an escalator to replace the stairs. The construction of an additional platform for westbound trains would eliminate the problem.

London 2012 Summer and Paralympic Games 
The station was temporarily modified to allow it to cope with an increase in passenger numbers during the London 2012 Olympic and Paralympic Games. A footbridge was constructed to connect the station to the Greenway foot and cycle path, which connects directly to the Olympic Park in Stratford.

Work began in January 2011, with the construction of temporary stairs and a walkway from the eastern end of the District line platforms, over the eastbound track and running back parallel to the platform ending at Manor Road. The footbridge was demolished in mid-October 2012, following the end of the 2012 Summer Paralympics. The foundations of the temporary footbridge have been left for possible use in future expansion of the station.
A double-ended centre siding east of West Ham was constructed to compensate for lost reversing capacity caused by the rebuilding of Whitechapel station as part of Crossrail work. This was commissioned on 17 January 2011.

North to south alignment
The Eastern Counties and Thames Junction Railway was constructed north to south through West Ham, linking Stratford with Canning Town in 1846. Platforms were constructed on the line at West Ham and opened on 14 May 1979 when the Crosstown Linkline service began between Camden Road and North Woolwich. The Crosstown Linkline was replaced with the electric North London Line service between Richmond and North Woolwich on 13 May 1985. In the 1990s, the station was comprehensively rebuilt as part of the Jubilee Line Extension, designed by van Heyningen and Haward Architects. A new bridge crosses four rail lines and a main road, to connect the Jubilee line and North London line platforms with the new ticket hall and the rest of the station. Jubilee line services began on 14 May 1999. North London Line services at the station ceased on 9 December 2006, when the line from Stratford to North Woolwich was closed, to allow for the line to be converted for the Docklands Light Railway. The platforms reopened on 31 August 2011 as part of the extension to Stratford International.

New entrance 
As part of the TwelveTrees development on the former Parcelforce distribution depot, a new station entrance is being built to connect to the upper Jubilee line concourse. As well as this, two new pedestrian bridges over the railway will be built.

Design
Designed by van Heyningen and Haward Architects, the station was rebuilt as part of the Jubilee Line Extension in the 1990s. The station consists of four sets of island platforms, two on an elevated east–west alignment and another perpendicular pair at street level, giving a total of eight platform faces.

The existing entrance was closed, with the old ticket hall refurbished to become a connecting concourse to the District and Hammersmith & City line platforms and the (new) c2c platforms. A new ticket hall - facing onto Manor Road - connects this concourse to the Jubilee line and North London line platforms via a high level bridge that spans four rail lines and a main road. The station building and connecting passageways are finished in a mixture of red brick, concrete and glass, inspired by Charles Holden. The station was built at a fraction of the cost of other Jubilee Line Extension stations, just £10.5m compared to over £100m at stations like Canary Wharf.

At the upper level, the northern island platform (Platform 1 and 2) are used by District line and Hammersmith & City line trains, and the southern island platform (Platforms 7 and 8) are used by c2c trains. At the lower level, the western island platform (Platforms 5 and 6) are used by Jubilee line trains, with the eastern island platform (Platforms 3 and 4) - formerly the North London line platforms - are now used by Docklands Light Railway trains.

Incidents 

On 15 March 1976, seven people were injured by a Provisional IRA bomb on a Metropolitan line train. The terrorist then shot and killed the train's driver Julius Stephen.

Location 
The station is located at the corner of Durban Road and Manor Road, in the London Borough of Newham. The station is named after the former parish and borough of West Ham within which it was located to the west of the centre. The neighbourhood of West Ham is located some distance to the north-east. Since West Ham United Football Club moved to the Boleyn Ground in 1904, the station is no longer located near their home ground. East London Rugby Football Club is situated nearby on Holland Road, which is also home to Kings Cross Steelers RFC and Phantoms RFC.

Services 

The station is in London fare zone 2 and zone 3. The typical off-peak weekday service from the station is:

tph=trains per hour

London Underground:

 12tph to Upminster (District line)
 3tph to Barking (District line)
 6tph to Barking (Hammersmith & City line)
 6tph to Hammersmith (Hammersmith & City line)
 6tph to Ealing Broadway (District line)
 6tph to Richmond (District line)
 3tph to Wimbledon (District line)
 20tph to Stratford (Jubilee line)
 12tph to Stanmore (Jubilee line)
 4tph to Wembley Park (Jubilee line)
 4tph to Willesden Green (Jubilee line)

DLR:

 6tph to Stratford International
 6tph to Woolwich Arsenal

C2C:

 4tph to Shoeburyness via Basildon
 2tph to Southend Central via Grays and Ockendon (all stations)
 2tph to Grays via Rainham (all stations)
 6tph to London Fenchurch Street

Connections
London Bus route 276 serves the station.

References

External links

District line stations
Hammersmith & City line stations
Docklands Light Railway stations in the London Borough of Newham
Jubilee line stations
London Underground Night Tube stations
Tube stations in the London Borough of Newham
Railway stations in the London Borough of Newham
Former London, Tilbury and Southend Railway stations
Railway stations in Great Britain opened in 1901
Railway stations served by c2c
Station
20th-century architecture in the United Kingdom
DfT Category C1 stations